Hotel Noir is a 2012 crime film directed and written by Sebastian Gutierrez. The film stars Carla Gugino and Rufus Sewell. The film was shot in color and processed as black and white. It was released as video on demand on October 9, 2012 in the United States. In 2016, the film was retitled City of Sin and re-released in color.

Plot
Los Angeles, 1958: a detective holes up in a downtown hotel awaiting killers to come get him. During the course of one night he will meet various occupants of the hotel and the truth of how he came to be in his present situation will be revealed.

Cast
 Rufus Sewell as Felix
 Malin Akerman as Swedish Mary
 Carla Gugino as Hanna Click
 Danny DeVito as Eugene Portland
 Rosario Dawson as Sevilla
 Kevin Connolly as Vance
 Robert Forster as Jim Logan
 Mandy Moore as Evangeline Lundy

Release
Through a Kickstarter campaign, the film received funding for an independently released theatrical run as well as through Video On Demand. The film premiered in Los Angeles on September 27, 2012 in addition to having a LACMA screening two days prior.

It was released in the United States through Video On Demand services on October 9, 2012. It opened in New York at the Cinema Village on October 12, 2012. Following this, the film received various runs in select cities nationwide through a partnership with Gathr Films.

Kickstarter backers for the film began receiving their exclusive DVD/BR releases on January 10, 2013. A limited-run soundtrack was also released.

The film also screened at the Warsaw Film Festival in Poland on October 12, 2012, as well as receiving international home releases in Germany and Australia.

In late 2016, the United States distribution rights to the film were picked up by Sony Pictures Home Entertainment, which re-released the film in Color on January 3, 2017 under the title City of Sin.

References

External links

2012 films
American crime comedy films
2012 direct-to-video films
2010s crime comedy films
Films directed by Sebastian Gutierrez
American independent films
American black-and-white films
2012 comedy films
2010s English-language films
2010s American films